In mathematics, the theorem of the cube is a condition for a line bundle over a product of three complete varieties to be trivial. It was a principle discovered, in the context of linear equivalence, by the Italian school of algebraic geometry. A treatment by means of sheaf cohomology, and description in terms of the Picard functor, was given 

Statement
The theorem states that for any complete varieties U, V and W over an algebraically closed field, and given points u, v and w on them, any invertible sheaf L which has a trivial restriction to each of U× V × {w}, U× {v} × W, and {u} × V × W, is itself trivial. (Mumford p. 55; the result there is slightly stronger, in that one of the varieties need not be complete and can be replaced by a connected scheme.)

Special cases
On a ringed space X, an invertible sheaf L is trivial if isomorphic to OX, as an OX-module. If the base X is a complex manifold, then an invertible sheaf is (the sheaf of sections of) a holomorphic line bundle, and trivial means holomorphically equivalent to a trivial bundle, not just topologically equivalent.

Restatement using biextensions
Weil's result has been restated in terms of biextensions, a concept now generally used in the duality theory of abelian varieties.

Theorem of the square
The theorem of the square   is a corollary (also due to Weil) applying to an abelian variety A. One version of it states that the function φL taking x∈A to TL⊗L−1  is a group homomorphism from A to Pic(A) (where T is translation by x on line bundles).

References

Notes

Abelian varieties
Algebraic varieties
Theorems in geometry